Arthur Winton was surgeon to the Meath Hospital until 1790. He was succeeded by Solomon Richards.

References 

Irish surgeons
Physicians of the Meath Hospital
18th-century Irish medical doctors
Year of birth missing
Year of death missing